The 2020 Australian GT Championship was scheduled to be the 24th running of the Australian GT Championship, a Motorsport Australia-sanctioned Australian motor racing championship open to FIA GT3 cars, FIA GT4 cars and similar cars as approved for the championship. The effects of the COVID-19 pandemic resulted in only the first round of the Australian Endurance Championship, and the first & second rounds of the Australian GT Trophy Series taking place before the rest of the season was abandoned.

Race calendar
The 2020 calendar was unveiled on 31 October 2019.
A revised calendar was announced on the 26 June 2020 as a result of the COVID-19 pandemic.
Ultimately, the COVID-19 pandemic resulted in all further rounds being cancelled.

Entry list

Australian Endurance Championship

Australian GT Trophy Series

Race results
Bold indicates overall winner.

Australian Endurance Championship

Australian GT Trophy Series

Championship standings
Points system

Australian Endurance Championship

Australian GT Trophy Series

Trofeo Challenge

Notes

References

External links

Australian GT Championship
GT Championship
Australian Endurance Championship